Minatori Sports Hall is a multi–use sports hall in Mitrovica, Kosovo which is the home of both, the KB Trepça basketball and KH Trepça handball teams.

History
In July 2013 the Mitroviceë municipality decided on renovations to the sports hall. In September 2013, work began on a complete renovation of the sports hall with funding from the local governments and the European Union that amounted to €1.1 million.

Gallery

References

External links 

 http://basketbolli.com/uploads/images/minatori_AjfiA.jpg
http://basketbolli.com/kombetarja/wp-content/uploads/2016/08/minatori_QTf5s.jpg

Mitrovica, Kosovo
Sports venues in Kosovo
Handball venues in Kosovo
Indoor arenas in Kosovo
Basketball venues in Kosovo
Sports venues completed in 1984